The German and Austrian Alpine Club (DuÖAV) was a merger of the German, Austrian and German Bohemian Alpine Club that existed from 1873 to 1938.

History
In 1862 the Sektion Austria was founded in Vienna by the academics Paul Grohmann, Friedrich Simony and Edmund von Mojsisovics. It was the first mountaineering club on the continent, modelled on the London Alpine Club. About seven years later, the Austrian mountaineer Franz Senn founded the Bildungsbürgerlicher Bergsteigerverein in Munich. Both organisations merged in 1873 to form the German and Austrian Alpine Club.

The main organisation consisted of numerous legally independent sections responsible for the upkeep of Alpine club huts and footpaths. From the mid 1920s the club placed an increased focus on environmental concerns of the high mountain regions.

On the other hand, club life was shaped by rising nationalism and antisemitism. Some sections, such as in Vienna or Munich, implemented an "Aryan paragraph" even before World War I. After 1919, Jewish members were expelled from the club. In turn, the Sektion Donauland was founded by Viktor Frankl and Fred Zinnemann as a resort for Jewish alpinists; it was excluded from the DuÖAV main organisation in 1924. Even in most Alpine club huts, Jewish mountaineers were not admitted.

While the cross-national DuÖAV first could not be co-opted into the Nazi German League of the Reich for Physical Exercise (DRL), the organisation lost its independence upon the Austrian Anschluss to Nazi Germany and the occupation of the Czechoslovak Sudetenland in 1938. After World War II the Austrian Alpine Club (ÖAV) was re-established in 1945, followed by the separate German Alpine Club (DAV) in 1952.

See also 
 Austrian Tourist Club
 South Tyrol Alpine Club

External links 
 Besprechung einer Sonderausstellungen des Deutschen Alpenvereins „Hast Du meine Alpen gesehen?“ und eines Vortrags von Martin Achrainer: „So, jetzt sind wir ganz unter uns!“, Antisemitismus im Alpenverein

References

Climbing organizations
Alpine clubs
1873 establishments
1938 disestablishments